Fordell is a rural community in the Whanganui District and Manawatū-Whanganui region of New Zealand's North Island. It is on the Marton-New Plymouth railway line east of Kaitoke and north of Whangaehu.

Demographics

There were 567 households. There were 1,029 males and 744 females, giving a sex ratio of 1.38 males per female. The median age was 44 years (compared with 37.4 years nationally), with 297 people (16.8%) aged under 15 years, 291 (16.4%) aged 15 to 29, 936 (52.9%) aged 30 to 64, and 243 (13.7%) aged 65 or older.

Ethnicities were 86.6% European/Pākehā, 18.5% Māori, 2.9% Pacific peoples, 1.0% Asian, and 1.5% other ethnicities (totals add to more than 100% since people could identify with multiple ethnicities).

The proportion of people born overseas was 10.7%, compared with 27.1% nationally.

Although some people objected to giving their religion, 50.7% had no religion, 38.1% were Christian, 0.5% were Hindu, 0.7% were Muslim and 3.1% had other religions.

Of those at least 15 years old, 207 (14.1%) people had a bachelor or higher degree, and 270 (18.3%) people had no formal qualifications. The median income was $25,600, compared with $31,800 nationally. The employment status of those at least 15 was that 741 (50.3%) people were employed full-time, 249 (16.9%) were part-time, and 36 (2.4%) were unemployed.

Education

Notable people 

 Charles Harris Burnett, born (1875) and farmed at Fordell before becoming an MP for Tauranga

 Henry Shafto Harrison, early settler (1847), the first MP for the Wanganui electorate, first and only President of the Wanganui Jockey Club.

References 

Whanganui District
Populated places in Manawatū-Whanganui